Johan (Jussi) Walfrid Sainio (3 October 1880, in Pyhäjärvi Ul – 31 August 1920, in Petrograd) was a Finnish pastry chef, trade union organiser and politician. He was a member of the Parliament of Finland from 1908 to 1917. In 1918 he took part in the Finnish Civil War on the Red side. After the collapse of the Finnish Socialist Workers' Republic he fled to Soviet Russia, where he was among the founders of the Communist Party of Finland (SKP). Sainio, along with seven other Finnish communists, was killed by members of the internal opposition of the SKP on 31 August 1920 during the Kuusinen Club Incident in Petrograd.

References

1880 births
1920 deaths
People from Karkkila
People from Uusimaa Province (Grand Duchy of Finland)
Social Democratic Party of Finland politicians
Communist Party of Finland politicians
Members of the Parliament of Finland (1908–09)
Members of the Parliament of Finland (1909–10)
Members of the Parliament of Finland (1910–11)
Members of the Parliament of Finland (1911–13)
Members of the Parliament of Finland (1913–16)
Members of the Parliament of Finland (1916–17)
People of the Finnish Civil War (Red side)
Assassinated Finnish people
 
Old Bolsheviks
Burials on the Field of Mars (Saint Petersburg)